Jordan Todosey (born February 8, 1995) is a Canadian actress. She is best known for her role as Adam Torres, the first transgender character on the long-running TV series Degrassi: The Next Generation, and as Lizzie McDonald on Life with Derek.

Early life 
Todosey was born and raised in Toronto, Ontario, Canada and began working as a child actor at a young age, making appearances in series such as Instant Star (2004–2008), Life with Derek (2005–2009) and Flashpoint (2008–2012).

Career

Degrassi 

Todosey is perhaps best known for playing a transgender character, Adam Torres, in the Degrassi franchise, becoming the first actor to portray a transgender character in the show's 30-year history.

For her performance, Todosey won a Gemini Award in 2011, for Best Performance in a Children's or Youth Program or Series, and the two-part episode "My Body Is a Cage" has also been widely recognized, including winning a Peabody Award in 2011, citing that Todosey "beautifully portrayed" a transgender character.

When Todosey's character was killed off from the series in 2013, controversy ensued, including a statement from GLAAD condemning the decision to kill off Todosey's character, while also calling Todosey's performance "authentic, multi-dimensional..."

Linda Schuyler, one of the show's creators, defended the choice to kill the character, saying in a statement that Todosey's storyline "will affect even more lives in an authentic way…"

Other work 
Todosey played Lizzie McDonald in the series Life with Derek and the spin-off movie Vacation with Derek. She also appeared in one episode of Flashpoint; in The Pacifier as a Firefly (Girl Scout); and in The Prize Winner of Defiance, Ohio as Tuff Ryan at 9 years old. She also voiced the main character, Willa, on the animated TV series Willa's Wild Life. She starred in Santa Baby as Amelia.

In 2015, she co-starred with Henry Rollins and Boo Boo Stewart in the thriller He Never Died. She is currently appearing as Tracey in Between and also recently appears in Murdoch Mysteries.

Filmography

References

External links 

1995 births
Actresses from Toronto
Canadian child actresses
Canadian film actresses
Canadian television actresses
Canadian voice actresses
Canadian Screen Award winners
Living people
21st-century Canadian actresses
Twitch (service) streamers